Ormond or Ormand is an old surname, originated in Ireland and Scotland, but also occurring nowadays in Portugal (mainly Azores), Brazil, England, Wales, Australia, New Zealand and the United States.

The Irish surname derives from the Irish toponym Oirmhumhain 'East Munster' and was a hereditary title within the Irish aristocracy. See Earl of Ormonde (Irish).

However, the Scottish Ormonds originate from the county of Angus, where the Douglas family held the title of Earl of Ormond, deriving from their ownership of Ormond Castle in Avoch, on the Black Isle in the Scottish Highlands. The Ormond surname is rumoured to have been taken up by an illegitimate son of the Earl in the 15th or 16th century. The earliest Ormond in Angus to feature on the parish records is Elspit Ormond, born 1617 in Monikie, the daughter of James Ormond.

There is also an Ormond family in Pembrokeshire, Wales, which is of great antiquity. It is likely that they branched off from the aforementioned Irish Ormonds, rather than having a separate origin. The National Archives hold the Will of William Ormond of Pembrokeshire, which was written in 1610.

The name can vary in spelling in old texts (as is typical of the English language generally). However the spelling Ormond is specific to the earldom, while Ormonde with an e is specific to the dukedom. (Jane Fenlon, 'The decorative plasterwork at Ormond castle: a unique survival', Architectural History, 41 (1998), 67–81, at 80).

People
 Bert Ormond, New Zealand international football (soccer) player
 Counts of Ormond, counts of the Holy Roman Empire
 Dale Ormond, first civilian director of RDECOM 
 Danny Ormand, current head of newly created Arkansas State Agency. A.C.I.C. Arkansas Crime Information Center and former county sheriff.
 Duncan Ormond, New Zealand international football (soccer) player
 Earl of Ormonde (Irish)
 Earl of Ormonde (Scottish)
 Francis Ormond, Australian philanthropist, founder of the Royal Melbourne Institute of Technology and patron of the University of Melbourne
 Gibby Ormond (1933–2010), Scottish footballer
 George Ormond (1889–1980), Scottish footballer (Rangers, Morton) 
 Herbert Ormond, Sir Herbert John Ormond.  English mayor, J.P. and draper
 Ian Ormond, New Zealand international football (soccer) player
 Jack Ormond, aka Tiaki Omana, former New Zealand Maori politician and rugby player
 James Ormond (disambiguation)
 Joan Ormond (died 1507), wife of John Ormond, esquire
 John Ormond, Welsh poet and filmmaker
 John Davies Ormond, superintendent of Hawke's Bay, New Zealand
 Sir John Davies Wilder Ormond, chairman of the New Zealand Meat Producers Board, Exports and Shipping council & shipping line
 Hon. John James Ormond, Assc. Justice Alabama Supreme Court (1837–1847)
 Julia Ormond, British actress
 Louisa Ormond (1798–1868), wife of Walter Forbes, 18th Lord Forbes
 Mary Ormond, wife of a notorious English pirate Blackbeard
 Richard Louis Ormond, (CBE), former director of the National Maritime Museum and noted author
 Roger Ormond, member of the Royal Council of North Carolina North Carolina statesman
 Saint Ormond, French saint of the 6th-century Catholic church; feastday January 23; elected Abbot of St. Maire c. 587
 Vicki Ormond, New Zealand international football (soccer) player
 Violet Sargent Ormond, sister of John Singer Sargent
 Wayne Ormond, Australian businessman
 Willie Ormond, Scotland international football (soccer) player and manager
 Hon. Wyriott Ormond Sr., Attorney General of N.C. J.P., Sheriff principal, Member of the Upper House & the Lower House of N.C. .
 Dr. Frank G. Ormonde, direct decedent of James Butler, 1st Duke of Ormonde, 12th Earl of Ormond; retired United States Navy senior officer; COO/CEO; chiropractic physician
 Franklin F. Ormonde, direct descendant of James Butler, 1st Duke of Ormonde, 12th Earl of Ormond; Professional Race Car Driver (Flyin' Frank Ormonde)

See also 
 Ormonde (disambiguation)
 Ormond (disambiguation)

Anglicised Irish-language surnames
Toponymic surnames